Southern Voice is the tenth studio album by American country music artist Tim McGraw, released on October 20, 2009, by Curb Records. It is the first album of all new material since Let It Go in 2007. The album produced three singles with "It's a Business Doing Pleasure with You", the title track, and "Still".

History
McGraw was originally to have released his next album in 2008. To extend the term of the singer's recording contract, Curb Records instead released a third greatest hits package from the artist, only two years after his second greatest hits release – a move which the singer publicly criticized. The release of the album was finally announced on June 30, 2009. The announcement also stated that McGraw would begin an extensive tour in support of the album in early 2010.

Singles
"It's a Business Doing Pleasure with You", written by Brett James and Nickelback lead vocalist Chad Kroeger, served as the album's lead-off single. It reached a peak of number 13 on the U.S. Billboard Hot Country Songs chart. The title-track was released in September 2009, as the second single, and "Still" as the third and final single.

Track listing

Personnel 
The following credits are sourced from liner notes included with the release.

 Tim McGraw – lead vocals (all tracks)

Musicians 
 Strings on tracks 1, 7, 9, & 12 arranged and composed by David Campbell.

Tracks 1-11
 Jeff McMahon – acoustic piano, Wurlitzer electric piano, Hammond B3 organ, synthesizers
 Denny Hemingson – electric guitar, pedal steel guitar
 Bob Minner – acoustic guitar
 Darran Smith – electric guitar
 Deano Brown – fiddle, mandolin
 John Marcus – bass
 Billy Mason – drums
 David Dunkley – percussion, congas

Additional musicians on Track 5
Jimmy Nichols – acoustic piano, Wurlitzer electric piano, Hammond B3 organ
 Byron Gallimore – electric guitar
 Brett Warren – harmonica

Track 12
 Jimmy Nichols – acoustic piano, synthesizers
 B. James Lowry – acoustic guitar
 Tom Bukovac – electric guitar
 Jerry McPherson – electric guitar
 Dan Dugmore – steel guitar
 Paul Bushnell – bass
 Shannon Forrest – drums

Backing vocals 
 Greg Barnhill (tracks 1, 3, 6, 7, 8, 10, 11)
 Russell Terrell (tracks 2, 4, 5)
 Tim McGraw (track 11)

Production 
 Byron Gallimore – producer, mixing 
 Tim McGraw – producer, mixing 
 Darran Smith – producer 
 Missi Gallimore – A&R direction 
 Julian King – tracking engineer 
 Allen Sides – string engineer (1, 9)
 Steve Churchyard – string engineer (7, 12)
 Sara Lesher – additional engineer, Pro Tools engineer, mix assistant 
 Erik Lutkins – additional engineer, Pro Tools engineer, mix assistant 
 David Bryant – assistant engineer 
 Colin Heldt – assistant engineer (1-11)
 Seth Morton – assistant engineer (12)
 Aaron Walk – assistant string engineer (1, 7, 9)
 Casey Lewis – assistant string engineer (12)
 Hank Williams – mastering 
 Kelly Clauge – creative director 
 Nick Davidge – creative director
 Glenn Sweitzer – art direction, design 
 Danny Clinch – photography 
 Mixed at Essential Sound Studio (Houston, Texas)
 Mastered at MasterMix (Nashville, Tennessee)

Charts and certifications

Weekly charts

Year-end charts

Certifications

Singles

References

External links
 

2009 albums
Tim McGraw albums
Curb Records albums
Albums produced by Byron Gallimore
Albums produced by Tim McGraw